The 2012 FIM Women's Motocross World Championship season was the eighth in the history of the championship. Kiara Fontanesi won her first riders' title, despite missing the final round, as Yamaha took their first Constructors' championship.

2012 Calendar

Riders' standings
Points are awarded to the top 20 classified finishers.

(key)

Motocross World Championship seasons
2012 in motorcycle sport
Motocross